The Intellectual Property Regulation Board (IPReg) is a body regulating the patent attorney and trademark attorney professions in the United Kingdom (UK). It was set up by the Chartered Institute of Patent Attorneys (CIPA) and the Institute of Trade Mark Attorneys (ITMA).

See also
European Patent Institute (epi)
Legal Services Act 2007
UK Intellectual Property Office

References

External links

United Kingdom patent law
Self-regulatory organisations in the United Kingdom
Legal regulators of the United Kingdom